Beeg may refer to:

 Beeg, Netherlands, the Limburgish name of Grevenbicht, a village in the Netherlands
 Bluegrass Beeg, a music festival taking place in Beeg
 Gunda Beeg, 19th-century German writer and activist
 Beeg Boy, a nickname for Rico Carty (born 1939), baseball player

See also
 Bee Gees
 Big (disambiguation)